Leucophenga is a genus of fruit flies (insects in the family Drosophilidae). There are at least 240 described species in Leucophenga.

See also
 List of Leucophenga species

References

Further reading

External links

 

Drosophilidae genera
Taxa named by Josef Mik
Articles created by Qbugbot